The 1984 Grand Prix motorcycle racing season was the 36th F.I.M. Road Racing World Championship season.

Season summary
Defending champion Freddie Spencer was the pre-season favorite to win the championship however, teething problems with Honda's new V4 and early season injuries squelched his hopes to repeat. In spite of his problems, Spencer still took five wins. Eddie Lawson lived up to his nickname of Steady Eddie with four wins and four second places to secure his first 500cc world championship on a Yamaha. Randy Mamola also had three wins to finish second on a factory backed Honda.

Yamaha also claimed the 250 crown with Frenchman Christian Sarron taking the honors ahead of a strong challenge from Real-Rotax mounted Manfred Herweh. Angel Nieto would win a thirteenth world championship with six wins in a row before sitting out the final two races. Stefan Dörflinger would be the first ever 80cc champion after the class displacement was increased from 50cc.

1984 Grand Prix season calendar
The following Grands Prix were scheduled to take place in 1984:

†† = Saturday race

Calendar changes
 The French Grand Prix was moved back, from 3 April to 11 June.
 The French Grand Prix moved from the Bugatti Circuit in Le Mans to the Paul Ricard circuit.
 The Spanish Grand Prix was moved forward, from 22 to 6 May.

Results and standings

1984 Grand Prix season results

Participants

500cc participants

250cc participants

500cc riders' standings

Scoring system
Points are awarded to the top ten finishers. A rider has to finish the race to earn points.
 

{|
|

† denotes the death of a rider

250cc standings

125cc standings

80cc standings

References
 Büla, Maurice & Schertenleib, Jean-Claude (2001). Continental Circus 1949-2000. Chronosports S.A. 

Grand Prix motorcycle racing seasons
Grand Prix motorcycle racing season